The Dulber Palace is a Moorish Revival palace designed by Nikolay Krasnov in Koreiz, near Yalta in Crimea. Also known as the Palace of Grand Duke Peter Nicolaievich of Russia, Dulber Palace (dülber is Crimean Tatar for "beautiful", originally from Persian, del-bar, "heart-stealing", "beloved, beautiful"), is an asymmetrical architectural extravaganza with crenellated walls, silver domes, and more than 100 rooms, inspired by the Mameluk architecture of 15th-century Cairo. This palace was built between 1895 and 1897.

See also
 Yusupov Palace, also in Koreiz, built for Prince Felix Yusupov in 1909

Tourist attractions in Crimea
Palaces in Ukraine
Egyptian Revival architecture
Moorish Revival palaces
Moorish Revival architecture in Ukraine
Buildings and structures in Yalta
Houses completed in 1897
Cultural heritage monuments of federal significance in Crimea